Glyphidocera janae is a moth in the family Autostichidae. It was described by Adamski and Brown in 2001. It is found in Venezuela.

The length of the forewings is 6.1 mm.

References

Moths described in 2001
Taxa named by David Adamski
Glyphidocerinae